Roman Catholic Diocese of Lafayette may refer to either of two different Roman Catholic dioceses in the United States:

Roman Catholic Diocese of Lafayette in Louisiana
Roman Catholic Diocese of Lafayette in Indiana